Bryan Emmett Clark (born March 14, 1964) is an American retired professional wrestler. He is best known for his appearances with World Championship Wrestling, the World Wrestling Federation and All Japan Pro Wrestling under the ring names The Nightstalker, Adam Bomb and Wrath and under his own name. He is a former WCW World Tag Team Champion and AJPW World Tag Team Champion.

Professional wrestling career

American Wrestling Association (1989–1990)
Clark made his wrestling debut in 1989 under the ring name The Nightstalker and quickly rose to a main event status wrestler. Clark competed in the Minnesota-based American Wrestling Association. He appeared at live AWA house and television events, mainly in the mid-west area of The United States. Some of these matches were broadcast on the ESPN, AWA Championship Wrestling show. (ESPN Classic continues to air re-runs of the show). Wrestling legend Ox Baker began to manage Clark during this time, providing for some classic promotional segments with Baker on the mic. The Nightstalker had a heated feud with The Trooper (Del Wilkes, later to be known as The Patriot). This began as The Nightstalker appeared during a Trooper match versus W.T. Jones on April 13, 1990, at an ESPN televised show in Rochester, Minnesota. Ox Baker began to challenge any and all wrestlers to include Larry Zbyszko, even telling The Trooper that he "couldn't even join the boy scouts". Clark's in ring look included black and white face paint, while gripping an over-sized hatchet.

World Championship Wrestling (1990–1991)
As the AWA went into dormancy in the fall of 1990, Clark made the jump to World Championship Wrestling. He made his first appearance on the November 10 edition of WCW Saturday Night and defeated Gary Jackson. Ten days later Clark faced Sid Vicious at Clash of the Champions XIII: Thanksgiving Thunder and was defeated. He then formed an alliance with The Big Cat and was scheduled to team with him against Vicious and Dan Spivey at Starrcade. Clark would miss the pay-per-view and be replaced by The Motor City Madman.

Clark would be absent from WCW until October 1991, when he made an appearance as a masked "ghoul" at Halloween Havoc. Two months later he replaced an injured Diamond Studd at Starrcade to team with Rick Steiner in a losing effort to Vader and Mr. Hughes.

Universal Wrestling Federation (1992)
Clark moved to Herb Abrams' Universal Wrestling Federation, making his first appearance on June 19, 1992, at a TV taping in Spartanburg, SC. He had three matches, defeating Johnny Kid and Jake Steele while losing by disqualification to Death Row 3260.

Smoky Mountain Wrestling (1992–1993)
Clark joined Smoky Mountain Wrestling in October 1992 and made his debut on a show in Knoxville, TN, losing to SMW Champion Brian Lee by countout. He later defeated Tracy Smothers to become the promotion's second-ever "Beat The Champ" Television Champion on February 2, 1993. He lost the title to Tim Horner six days later.

World Wrestling Federation (1993–1995)
On March 8, 1993, Clark received a tryout match for the World Wrestling Federation, wrestling Reno Riggins at a WWF Superstars taping in North Charleston, South Carolina as The Nightstalker. He had another tryout match the following night at a WWF Wrestling Challenge taping, defeating Ricky Nelson. In May 1993, Clark debuted as Adam Bomb, the newest client of Johnny Polo. Wearing luminous green contact lenses, and sporting a red tongue. Bomb's gimmick was that of a survivor of the infamous Three Mile Island nuclear meltdown accident, which was further emphasized by his ring name being a pun on the "atom bomb". This gimmick was partly realistic; Clark had actually been born and raised in Harrisburg, Pennsylvania, not far from Three Mile Island. Seven months after his debut, Harvey Wippleman replaced Polo as Bomb's manager because Polo wanted to focus on managing WWF Tag Team Champions The Quebecers. The Adam Bomb concept and costume was designed and created by Tom Fleming.

Bomb made his pay-per-view debut at Survivor Series, where he teamed up with Irwin R. Schyster, Diesel and "The Model" Rick Martel against Razor Ramon, The 1-2-3 Kid, Marty Jannetty and "The Macho Man" Randy Savage in an elimination match. His team went on to lose the match, though he was the last remaining wrestler for his team before being pinned by Jannetty after a roll-up.

Following this, he participated in the 1994 Royal Rumble, where he was the final entrant in the match. However, he lasted less than five minutes before being eliminated by Lex Luger. He also was one of nine wrestlers who helped Yokozuna beat Undertaker during a Casket match. Following the Rumble and a feud with Earthquake, at WrestleMania X, Bomb lost to Earthquake in 35 seconds. Bomb turned face after his manager Harvey Wippleman turned on him and helped new client Kwang attack him. As a face, he would throw rubber nuclear missiles into the audience as he walked to the ring and after he won a match. After briefly feuding with Kwang and Bam Bam Bigelow, Bomb was moved down the card and began competing exclusively on WWF Superstars before leaving the promotion in August 1995.

Independent Circuit and England (1995-1996)
After leaving WWF, Clark continued using the Adam Bomb name in the independent circuit and England in 1996 where he worked for Hammerlock Bomb Alert Tour with Andre Baker.

Return to World Championship Wrestling (1997-2001)

Blood Runs Cold (1997–1999) 
At Uncensored 1997, Clark rejoined WCW as Wrath, a helmeted martial artist who, along with Mortis, battled Glacier and Ernest Miller. The four characters, collectively known as "Blood Runs Cold", was WCW's attempt to tap into the popularity of the Mortal Kombat video games. The angle continued until 1998 when Clark suffered an injury. After recovery, he returned to singles action later in the year as a face, debuting both a new attire and finishing move called the Meltdown while all Blood Runs Cold references were phased out. After a lengthy undefeated streak, Clark was rumored to be slated to become a future challenger to Bill Goldberg but had his momentum stopped on November 23, 1998, in a big loss to Kevin Nash. Wrath would continue to gain many victories into 1999 and entered a feud with Bam Bam Bigelow. At WCW/nWo Souled Out, Bigelow defeated Wrath to end the feud. Clark tore his ACL in a match against Jerry Flynn on April 15, 1999, and spent a year recuperating.

KroniK (2000–2001) 

Clark returned to the ring in April 2000, now using his real name. He formed a tag team with Brian Adams known as KroniK, and both became members of the New Blood. However, KroniK switched allegiances to the Millionaires Club after Vince Russo betrayed them and, on May 15, 2000, they defeated Shane Douglas and The Wall to win the vacant World Tag Team Championship. They later lost the title on May 30 to New Blood members Shawn Stasiak and Chuck Palumbo. KroniK was granted a rematch for the title at Bash at the Beach on July 9, and was successful in reclaiming World Tag Team Championship. KroniK then entered a feud with the entire Natural Born Thrillers stable, but retained the title against the Thrillers before losing it to Vampiro and The Great Muta at New Blood Rising on August 13. Following the title loss, KroniK turned heel after Vince Russo managed to bribe them in order to have them attack Bill Goldberg, who would be fired if he lost a single match. However, Goldberg managed to overcome the odds and pinned both Clark and Adams in a handicap match at Halloween Havoc. KroniK continued working as "hired muscle" by helping The Boogie Knights battle The Filthy Animals, and eventually helped their former enemies the Natural Born Thrillers before turning face once again in January 2001 by siding with Ernest Miller.

KroniK was sidelined when Clark needed stitches for a wound from a chair shot while Adams was hospitalized with appendicitis. While they were injured, WCW was purchased by the World Wrestling Federation in March 2001.

Return to World Wrestling Federation (2001)
Clark and Adams returned to the WWF on the September 4, 2001 episode of SmackDown! by attacking and double chokeslamming The Undertaker. The team would go on to face The Brothers of Destruction at Unforgiven 2001 in a match for the WCW Tag Team Championship, which Clark and Adams lost. After two dark matches and a pay-per-view appearance, Clark was asked to go in developmental and he left the meeting on the spot, getting released from his contract while Adams began working for the Heartland Wrestling Association, which served as WWF's developmental territory.

Late career and retirement (2001–2003)
After Brian Adams was released from the WWF in November 2001, he and Clark reformed KroniK made a number of appearances on the independent circuit, most prominently for World Wrestling All-Stars and All Japan Pro Wrestling. During their time in AJPW, they defeated Keiji Mutoh and Taiyō Kea for the World Tag Team Championship on July 17, 2002. KroniK were later stripped of the title due to contract problems. They wrestled their last match together in January 2003, losing to Goldberg and Keiji Mutoh. Shortly afterwards, both Adams and Clark retired due to injuries.

Personal life
In February 2006, Clark had surgery on his lower back for injuries sustained during his career. He owns the Trademarks to the KroniK, Adam Bomb and Wrath gimmicks during his time in WCW, WWE and the WWF. Following the death of his partner Brian Adams, Clark considered their time together as part of KroniK to be the highlight of his career. He occasionally trains other wrestlers and appears at conventions.

In July 2016, Clark was named part of a class action lawsuit filed against WWE which alleged that wrestlers incurred traumatic brain injuries during their tenure and that the company concealed the risks of injury. The suit was litigated by attorney Konstantine Kyros, who has been involved in a number of other lawsuits against WWE. The lawsuit was dismissed by US District Judge Vanessa Lynne Bryant in September 2018. The lawsuit is now being heard by the Supreme Court in the Fall of 2021.

In February 2020, Clark was arrested in Arizona on five felony charges relating to alleged acts between January and April 2019. They include conspiracy, drug possession, illegal control of enterprise, transporting or selling narcotics, and possessing a weapon during a drug offense. He pleaded not guilty to all. On June 18, 2021, all charges were “dismissed by prosecution motion”  in the Superior Court of Maricopa County. Bryan Clark's entire case was thrown out.

Championships and accomplishments
All Japan Pro Wrestling
World Tag Team Championship (1 time) – with Brian Adams
Pro Wrestling Illustrated
Ranked No. 47 of the top 500 singles wrestlers of the year in the PWI 500 in 1995
 Ranked No. 466 of the top 500 singles wrestlers of the "PWI Years" in 2003
Smoky Mountain Wrestling
SMW Beat the Champ Television Championship (1 time)
World Championship Wrestling
WCW World Tag Team Championship (2 times) – with Brian Adams
Wrestling Observer Newsletter
Worst Tag Team (2000, 2001) with Brian Adams
Worst Worked Match of the Year (2001) with Brian Adams vs. The Undertaker and Kane at Unforgiven

References

External links

1964 births
American male professional wrestlers
Living people
Masked wrestlers
Professional wrestlers from Pennsylvania
Sportspeople from Harrisburg, Pennsylvania
20th-century professional wrestlers
21st-century professional wrestlers
World Tag Team Champions (AJPW)
SMW Beat the Champ Television Champions
WCW World Tag Team Champions